Iftikhar Nagar Cheema is a small village located in Gujranwala district in the region of Pakistan's Punjab.

References 

Villages in Gujranwala District